37 Canadian Brigade Group is a reserve component brigade of the Canadian Army, which supervises Militia units in 5th Canadian Division for New Brunswick and Newfoundland and Labrador. It was created in 1992 by merging the New Brunswick Militia District and the Newfoundland and Labrador Militia District.

Brigade units

References 

Brigades of the Canadian Army
Military units and formations established in 1992
Organizations based in Moncton